Albert Gallatin Ellis (August 24, 1800December 23, 1885) was one of the first American pioneers to settle in Wisconsin.  He was the 2nd, 6th, 8th, and 10th Mayor of Stevens Point, Wisconsin.  Before statehood, he was a member of the legislature of the Wisconsin Territory and was a publisher of the first newspaper west of Lake Michigan.

Biography
Ellis was born in Verona, New York, on August 24, 1800. An Episcopalian missionary, Ellis moved to Green Bay, Wisconsin Territory, with members of the Oneida people to establish a colony and a school. He later became involved in the Public Land Survey System before becoming a publisher of the Green Bay Intelligencer in 1834, the first newspaper west of Lake Michigan. In 1852, Ellis moved to Stevens Point, Wisconsin, where he worked with the General Land Office and became a surveyor general, as well as once again became a newspaper publisher, eventually becoming an editor. Ellis died on December 23, 1885.

Two of his sons, Eleazor H. Ellis and Frederick S. Ellis, became mayors of Green Bay.

Political career
Ellis served as secretary to the Seventh Michigan Territorial Council for the western area of Michigan Territory. In 1836 and again from 1841 to 1844, Ellis was a member of the Wisconsin Territorial House of Representatives of the Wisconsin Territorial Legislature. After Wisconsin's admission to the Union, Ellis served as Mayor of Stevens Point. He was a Democrat.

References

People from Verona, New York
Politicians from Green Bay, Wisconsin
People from Stevens Point, Wisconsin
Mayors of places in Wisconsin
Members of the Michigan Territorial Legislature
Members of the Wisconsin Territorial Legislature
Wisconsin Democrats
Editors of Wisconsin newspapers
American newspaper publishers (people)
American Anglican missionaries
1800 births
1885 deaths
Anglican missionaries in the United States
19th-century American journalists
American male journalists
19th-century American male writers
19th-century American politicians
Writers from Green Bay, Wisconsin
19th-century American Episcopalians
19th-century American businesspeople